Lewis Michael Soloff (February 20, 1944 – March 8, 2015) was an American jazz trumpeter, composer, and actor.

Biography
From his birth place of New York City, United States, he studied trumpet at the Eastman School of Music and the Juilliard School.  He worked with Blood, Sweat & Tears from 1968 until 1973. Prior to this he worked with Machito,  Tony Scott, Maynard Ferguson, and Tito Puente.

In the 1980s, he was a member of Members Only, a jazz ensemble who recorded for Muse Records.

Soloff was a regular member and sub-leader of Gil Evans' Monday Night Orchestra, started from 1983, and trained his ability as band leader. His debut album recording was supported by Gil. His 2010 recording Sketches of Spain is a tribute to the classic 1959-60 Miles Davis-Gil Evans collaboration, and he has performed the reconstructed Evans arrangements of George Gershwin's Porgy and Bess. Soloff was also a longtime member of the Manhattan Jazz Quintet and Mingus Big Band.

Soloff made frequent guest appearances with jazz orchestras all over the world such as the Lincoln Center Jazz Orchestra (directed by Wynton Marsalis) and the Magic City Jazz Orchestra (directed by Ray Reach).

He was among a handful of trumpeters capable of playing demanding lead trumpet parts while also contributing improvisational solos and of playing baroque, classical, and later orchestral and chamber music styles, which made him an in-demand session player for commercials and soundtracks.

Soloff died in 2015, at the age of 71, after suffering a heart attack in New York City.

Discography

As leader
Air on a G String, 2003 -  Larry Willis (piano), Francois Moutin (bass), Victor Lewis (drums)
Rainbow Mountain, 2000 - Lou Marini (saxophones, flute), Joe Beck (guitar), Mark Egan (bass), Danny Gottlieb (drums).  Also with special guests: Delmar Brown (synthesizers, vocal), Hiram Bullock (guitar), Will Lee (bass), Jeff "Tain" Watts (drums), Miles Evans (trumpet), Paul Shaffer (Hammond B-3 organ)
With a Song In My Heart, 1999 Rob Mounsey (arranger),  Victor Lewis (drums), Emily Mitchell Soloff (harp), Mulgrew Miller (piano), George Mraz (bass)
Little Wing, 1991 - Ray Anderson (trombone), Gil Goldstein (piano, synthesizers, accordion), Pete Levin (organ, synthesizers, vocoder), Mark Egan (bass), Kenwood Dennard (drums), Manolo Badrena (percussion).  Produced by Steve Swallow
My Romance, 1989 -  Mark Egan (bass), Janis Siegel (vocal), Danny Gottlieb (drums), Pete Levin (synthesizers), Airto Moreira (percussion), Gil Goldstein (piano, synthesizers), Emily Michell Soloff (harp)
Speak Low, 1987 - Kenny Kirkland (piano), Richard Davis (bass), Elvin Jones (drums)
Yesterdays, 1986 -Mike Stern (guitar), Charnett Moffett (bass), Elvin Jones (drums)
Hanalei Bay, 1983  Gil Evans (electric piano), Pete Levin (synthesizer), Hiram Bullock (guitar), Adam Nussbaum (drums), Mark Egan (bass), Manolo Badrena (percussion)

As sideman
With Franco Ambrosetti
 Tentets (Enja, 1985)
With Ray Anderson
 Big Band Record (Gramavision, 1994) with the George Gruntz Concert Jazz Band
 Don't Mow Your Lawn (Enja, 1994)
With George Benson
 Tell It Like It Is (A&M/CTI, 1969)
 Big Boss Band (Warner Bros., 1990)
With Carla Bley
 Fleur Carnivore (Watt, 1989)
 The Very Big Carla Bley Band (Watt, 1990)
 Big Band Theory, 1993
 The Carla Bley Big Band Goes to Church (Watt, 1996)
 4 x 4 (Watt, 1999)
 Looking for America (Watt, 2003)
With Blood, Sweat & Tears
 Blood, Sweat & Tears, 1969 Grammy Award for Album of the Year
 Blood, Sweat & Tears 3, 1970
 Blood, Sweat & Tears 4, 1971
 New Blood, 1972
 No Sweat, 1973
With Hank Crawford
 Night Beat (Milestone, 1989)
 Groove Master (Milestone, 1990)
With Gil Evans
 The Gil Evans Orchestra Plays the Music of Jimi Hendrix (RCA, 1974)
 There Comes a Time (RCA, 1975)
 Parabola (Horo, 1979)
 Gil Evans Live at the Royal Festival Hall London 1978 (RCA, 1979)
 Live at the Public Theater (New York 1980) (Trio, 1981)
 Live at Sweet Basil (Gramavision, 1984 [1986])
 Live at Sweet Basil Vol. 2 (Gramavision, 1984 [1987])
 Bud and Bird (Electric Bird/King, 1986 [1987])
 Farewell (Evidence, 1986 [1992])
 Live At Umbria Jazz Vol. 1 & 2, 2001
With Maynard Ferguson
 Ridin' High (Enterprise, 1967)
With Ricky Ford
 Hot Brass (Candid, 1991)
With Michael Franks
 Tiger in the Rain (Warner Bros., 1979)
 Objects of Desire (Warner Bros., 1982)
 The Camera Never Lies (Warner Bros., 1987)
With Dizzy Gillespie
 Cornucopia (Solid State, 1969) 
With Jimmy Heath
 Little Man Big Band (Verve, 1992)
With O'Donel Levy
 Simba (Groove Merchant, 1974)
 Everything I Do Gonna Be Funky (Groove Merchant, 1974)
 Windows (Groove Merchant, 1976)
With Herbie Mann
 Brazil: Once Again (Atlantic, 1977)
With Helen Merrill
 Brownie: Homage to Clifford Brown (Verve, 1994)
With Tisziji Munoz
 The Paradox of Completion (Anami Music, 2015)
With Bobby Previte
 The 23 Constellations of Joan Miró (Tzadik Records, 2002)
With Dakota Staton
 I Want a Country Man (Groove Merchant, 1973)
With Jeremy Steig
 Firefly (CTI, 1977)
With Sonny Stitt
 Stomp Off Let's Go (Flying Dutchman, 1976)
With Stanley Turrentine
 The Man with the Sad Face (Fantasy, 1976)
 Nightwings (Fantasy, 1977)

With others
Lincoln Center Jazz Orchestra, A Love Supreme, 2005
Cold Feet, Cold Feet plays Jazz Feet, 2003
Bob Belden, Black Dahlia, 2001
Aretha Franklin, Aretha, 1980
Manhattan Jazz Quintet, I Got Rhythm, 2001
Teo Macero, Impressions of Miles Davis, 2001
Ray Anderson, Don't Mow Your Lawn, 1999
Trumpet Legacy — Various Artists featuring Lew Soloff, Nicholas Payton, Tom Harrell and Eddie Henderson, 1998
Giovanni Hidalgo, Time Shifter, 1996
Rob Mounsey's Flying Monkey Orchestra, Mango Theory, 1995
Flying Monkey Orchestra, Back In The Pool, 1995
Various Artists, Jazz At Lincoln Center — They Came to Swing, 1994
Frankie Valli, Closeup, 1975
Ray Anderson's Pocket Brass, Where Home Is, 1994
Giovanni Hidalgo, Worldwide, 1993
Daniel Schnyder, Mythology, 1992
Marlena Shaw, Take a Bite, 1979
Chaka Khan, What Cha' Gonna Do For Me, 1981
Manhattan Jazz Quintet, Manteca, 1992
Charlie Musselwhite, Signature, 1991
Teresa Brewer, Memories of Louis, 1991
Marianne Faithfull, Blazing Away 1990
Joss Stone, Colour Me Free!, 2009
Danny Gottlieb, Whirlwind, 1989
Hilton Ruiz, Strut, 1988
Hilton Ruiz, Something Grand, 1986
Tramaine Hawkins, In the Morning Time, 1985
Frank Sinatra, L.A. Is My Lady, 1984
Electronic Sonata for Souls Loved by Nature (1980) with George Russell
Sinéad O'Connor, Am I Not Your Girl?, 1992
Grant Green, Easy, 1978
Various Artists, The Atlantic Family Live in Montreaux, 1977
Barry Miles, Barry Miles, 1970
Art Garfunkel, Scissors Cut, 1981
Paul Simon, Graceland, 1986
Joe Beck, Back to Beck, 1988
Fred Lipsius, ''Better Believe It  mja Records 1996)

References

External links

 – official site

Lew Soloff image search at Yahoo!
Lew Soloff at Artists Direct
Lew Soloff at Batesmeyer
Lew Soloff at Hollywood.com
Lew Soloff in Jazz Times
Lew Soloff at Jazz Trumpets
Lew Soloff at MTV
Lew Soloff biography at VH1
Video:  played by Lew Soloff

1944 births
2015 deaths
American jazz trumpeters
American male trumpeters
American jazz flugelhornists
Grammy Award winners
Big band bandleaders
Juilliard School alumni
Jewish American composers
Musicians from New York City
American jazz bandleaders
American jazz horn players
Mainstream jazz trumpeters
Eastman School of Music alumni
Swing trumpeters
Bebop trumpeters
Milestone Records artists
Blood, Sweat & Tears members
Jazz musicians from New York (state)
American male jazz musicians
White Elephant Orchestra members
Manhattan Jazz Quintet members
Members Only (band) members
21st-century American Jews